Motion Twin is an independent studio specializing in online video games. Founded in 2001 the company is a worker cooperative enterprise based in Bordeaux, France.

History

With the success of Dead Cells into 2019, Motion Twin wanted to move onto their next game while still supporting Dead Cells. However, they still wanted to remain a small cooperative of eight to ten persons, so internally, they created a new development team called Evil Empire around January 2019 to take over the development and support of Dead Cells while the other Motion Twin developers started on their next project.

Motion Twin is run as an anarcho-syndicalist workers cooperative with equal salary and decision-making power between its members. As part of the legal model, Motion Twin is required to pass a set percentage of its profits to its workers. In August 2019, Motion Twin spun off a new studio, Evil Empire, composed of Dead Cells developers who wanted to continue its development while Motion Twin moved to a new project. Evil Empire is run by Motion Twin's former head of marketing and is not run as a cooperative, particularly because the company wanted to scale beyond ten employees. Motion Twin continues to participate in Dead Cells decisions.

Games

The company initially gained notice through the release of games such as Hammerfest, My Brute, Mush, Die2Nite, AlphaBounce and the social game platform Twinoid, and now has a community of 15 million registered users. Since the development of Dead Cells, Motion Twin neglected Twinoid with all its games leading to a strong decline of players.

As of yet the future of the platform with all its games is unknown, although it has been said that the games will not be updated following Adobe Flash Player's end of life, which was announced for the 1st of January 2021, leading to the likely extinction of the platform.

However, a group of fellow players has decided to save Twinoids games and created a platform called Eternal-Twin (with Motion Twin's consent), which aims to re-create as many games as possible without using Adobe Flash Player. Thus, those who still want to play after Flash Player's end of life will be able to do so.

All games developed by Motion Twin, with the exception of Dead Cells, can be accessed and played for free with some games including a premium option (subscriptions and items) which create revenue for the company. In 2009, the company had a turnover of 4 million euros.

Products
Nicolas Cannasse, a former developer at Motion Twin, has been responsible for the creation of freeware and open source compilers and multimedia technologies, many of which build on the Adobe Flash platform.

His published products include:
 MTASC - fast ActionScript 2 compiler
 Haxe - multi-platform language similar to ActionScript 3
 NekoVM - VM-based runtime and language

Programming and development 
The company, although known to the public for its browser games in flash, is at the origin of various tools and programming languages which it uses for its own developments, and which it makes available under a free license. Under the impetus of one of its co-founders, Nicolas Canasse, the Bordeaux company is, for example, at the origin of the MTASC compiler, for Motion Twin ActionScript 2 Compiler, the first free ActionScript 2,0 compilers.

Haxe, a technology considered to be the successor to the MTASC compiler, also invented and developed by Motion Twin, is a cross-platform language that makes it possible, from a single standardized language, to compile the same source file by targeting different platforms such as JavaScript, Flash, NekoVM, PHP or C++. This language was the subject of a book, Professional Haxe and Neko, by Franco Ponticelli and L. McColl-Sylveste, released in 2008 by John Wiley & Sons.

Motion Twin has also developed its own virtual machine, called Neko. Neko is both a high-level, dynamically typed programming language whose source files, once compiled, can be run on the NekoVM virtual machine. The company is also the initiator of various libraries for the OCaml and PHP programming languages. She is thus at the origin of the SPOD library, which allows persistence within a PHP environment.

References

External links

Companies based in Bordeaux
Video game companies established in 2001
Video game companies of France
Video game development companies
Worker cooperatives
French companies established in 2001